Rachel Haymon is a marine geologist known for her work linking geological and biological processes occurring at deep-sea hydrothermal vents. In 2005 she was elected a fellow of the Geological Society of America.

Education and career 
As a child growing up in Baton Rouge Louisiana, Marie Curie was the only woman scientist Haymon knew. Haymon had multiple ideas about careers as a child, including several scientific options such as oceanographer, archeologist, astronaut. or paleontologist. In college, she decided to study geology and has a B.A. from Rice University (1976). In 1982, she earned her Ph.D. from the University of California, San Diego working on hydrothermal deposits at 21°N on the East Pacific Rise. Following her Ph.D., she accepted a position at the University of California, Santa Barbara where she was promoted to professor in 1998. Haymon retired from full professor in 2010.

Research 
Haymon's research centers on the deposition of minerals at deep-sea hydrothermal vents. Haymon's work on ophiolites in Oman revealed fossils of hydrothermal vent worms and geological evidence of hydrothermal venting.  As a graduate student, Haymon worked on the mineralogy of hydrothermal vents at 21ºN North along the East Pacific Rise using samples collected during the RISE project. Using data from 1989, Haymon mapped the distribution of hydrothermal vents along the 9ºNorth of the East Pacific Rise. Then, in 1991, Haymon led the team that returned to this site and discovered a recent eruption on the seafloor. They dubbed the area "Tube Worm Barbecue" because of the dead tubes worms found in the regions with recent lava flow. Haymon described the excitement of seeing the outcome of the recent eruption in a subsequent newspaper article. Repeated visits to the area revealed the tube worms were gone within eleven months after the eruption, replaced by small fish, octopus, and crabs. Later work by Haymon on the East Pacific Rise revealed hydrothermal venting along the ridge-flank sites, away from the black smokers. In 2006, Haymon led the team that discovered the first black smokers within the hydrothermal vents fields near the Galapagos.

Selected publications

Awards and honors 

 AAAS-Newcomb-Cleveland Award (1980), for Spiess et al. paper
 Hans Pettersson Bronze Medal, Royal Swedish Academy of Sciences (1999)
 Fellow, Geological Society of America (2005)

References

External links 
 
 1979 archived photo of Haymon

1953 births
American women geologists
Fellows of the Geological Society of America
Living people
Marine geologists
Rice University alumni
University of California, San Diego alumni
University of California, Santa Barbara faculty
21st-century American women